James Templeton Broadfoot McKinnell (27 March 1893 – October 1972) was a Scottish professional footballer who played as a left half, mainly for Dumfries club Queen of the South, Blackburn Rovers and Darlington.

McKinnell moved from Queens to Rovers at the start of the 1920-21 season. McKinnell was one of three players from the Dumfries club, alongside Willie McCall and Tom Wylie to move to the English Football League around that time. These three transfers combined with Ian Dickson's move to Aston Villa helped fund the Doonhamers purchase of Palmerston Park.

McKinnell played in 111 league matches and 13 FA Cup games in six seasons for the Ewood Park club. McKinnell then signed for Darlington, where he played in 101 league matches and scored one goal in three seasons. McKinnell then signed for Nelson at the start of the 1929-30 season, where he played 10 league matches before retiring at the end of that season.

References

People from Dalbeattie
Footballers from Dumfries and Galloway
Scottish footballers
Scottish football managers
Ayr United F.C. players
Queen of the South F.C. players
Blackburn Rovers F.C. players
Nelson F.C. players
Darlington F.C. players
Scottish Football League players
English Football League players
Queen of the South F.C. managers
1972 deaths
1893 births
Association football wing halves